Julvisa, also known after the opening lines Giv mig ej glans, ej guld, ej prakt, is a Christmas song written by Zacharias Topelius in 1887. It was originally published in Publicistklubben's magazine Julqvällen and appears in the fourth volume of Zacharias Topelius' Samlade skrifter. It was set to music by 30 year old Jean Sibelius in 1895 (opus 1, number 4).

In Finnish, the song's opening lines are "En etsi valtaa, loistoa" and the song was originally published in Finnish in 1909, probably with lyrics by Martti Korpilahti, and was adopted in the 1986 Finnish hymnal, with lyrics by Niilo Rauhala in 1984. However, the older Finnish language-version had already become popular, and is commonly sung.

The song is one of the most popular Christmas songs in Finland.

Publication
 Julvisa in 
 Julvisa in 
 Finlandssvenska psalmboken as number 510 in the 1923 edition of the 1886 Finnish hymnal version under the lines ”Julpsalmer”.
 Finlandssvenska psalmboken 1943 as number 28 under the lines ”Jul”.
 Frälsningsarméns sångbok 1968 as number 591 under the lines ”Högtider - Jul”.
 Finlandssvenska psalmboken 1986 as number 32 under the lines ”Jul”.
 1986 års psalmbok i Sverige as number 645, as a bilingual song in two versions under the lines "From Finland".
 Virsikirja 1986 as number 31 in the section ”Joulu” (Christmas).
 Psalmer och Sånger 1987 as number 491 under the lines ”Jul”.
 Frälsningsarméns sångbok 1990 as number 722 under the lines ”Kyrkoårets högtider, Jul”.
 Several non-religious songbooks

See also
 List of Christmas carols

References

1887 poems
1895 songs
Finnish Christian hymns
Swedish-language songs
Swedish Christmas songs
Christmas carols
19th-century hymns